East Jesus may refer to:

A small town in the middle of nowhere
East Jesus, an art installation at Slab City in southern California, USA
East Jesus (album), a compilation of music by Lee Ranaldo